Tyrrhenia may refer to:

 Tyrrhenia aka Etruria or Tyrsenia, the land of the Etruscans, a pre-Indo-European-speaking people on the Italic peninsula, that was subsumed into the growing Roman Republic.
 An era of Etruria, see List of Iron Age states
 Sea of Tyrrhenia, a region of the Mediterranean, between Italy, Sicily, Corsica, Sardinia
  (1920-1940), British oceanliner
 A subgenus of Nebria containing:
 Nebria apuana
 Nebria eugeniae
 Nebria fulviventris
 Nebria lareyniei
 Nebria orsinii
 Nebria reymondi
 Nebria rubicunda rubicunda
 Nebria testacea
 Nebria uluderensis
 Nebria vanvolxemi

See also

 Tyrrhenian (disambiguation)
 Tyrsenian (disambiguation) aka Tyrrhenian
 Etruscan (disambiguation) aka Tyrrhenian
 Etrurian (disambiguation) aka Tyrrhenian
 Etruria (disambiguation) aka Tyrrhenia